The 2015–16 West Coast Conference women's basketball season began with practices in October 2015 and ended with the 2016 West Coast Conference women's basketball tournament at the Orleans Arena March 3–8, 2016 in Paradise, Nevada. The regular season started in November, with the conference schedule starting at the end of December.

This was the 31st season for WCC women's basketball, which began in the 1985–86 season when the league was known as the West Coast Athletic Conference (WCAC). It was also the 27th season under the West Coast Conference name (the conference began as the California Basketball Association in 1952, became the WCAC in 1956, and dropped the word "Athletic" in 1989).

Pre-season
 Pre-season media day took place in October at the Time Warner Cable SportsNet and Time Warner Cable Deportes Studios. Video interviews will be hosted on the WCC's streaming video outlet, TheW.tv, beginning at 11:30 AM PDT. Jeff Lampe of WCC Live interviewed each coach and got a preview of their respective season. The regional television schedule announcement, the Pre-season Conference team, and the pre-season coaches rankings were some of the additional events that took place.

2015–16 West Coast Women's Basketball Media Poll
Rank, School (first-place votes), Points
1. Gonzaga (6), 78
2. BYU (4), 76
3. Saint Mary's, 61
4. San Diego , 58
5. San Francisco, 51
6. Pacific, 40
7. Santa Clara, 30
8. Loyola Marymount, 25
9. Pepperdine, 20
10. Portland, 11

2015–16 West Coast Women's Preseason All-West Conference Team
Player, School, Yr., Pos.
Kylie Maeda, BYU, Sr., G
Lexi Eaton Rydalch, BYU, Sr., F
Shelby Cheslek, Gonzaga, Sr., C
Ellie Tinkle, Gonzaga, Sr., G
Sophie Taylor, Loyola Marymount, Sr., F
Hailie Eackles, Pacific, Sr., G
Shannon Mauldin, Saint Mary's, Sr., G
Lauren Nicholson, Saint Mary's, Sr., G
Malina Hood, San Diego, Sr., F
Taylor Proctor, San Francisco, Sr., F

College Sports Madness Preseason All-West Conference Team

Coach of the Year- Lisa Fortier, Gonzaga
Player of the Year- Lexi Rydalch, BYU
Freshman of the Year- Andee Velsaco, Loyola Marymount

First Team
Lexi Rydalch, G, BYU
Lauren Nicholson, G, Saint Mary's
Malina Hood, G, San Diego
Elle Tinkle, G/F, Gonzaga
Taylor Proctor, F/C, San Francisco

Second Team
Hailie Eackles, G, Pacific
Shannon Mauldin, G, Saint Mary's
Zhane Dikes, G, San Francisco
Leslie Lopez-Wood, G/F, Loyola Marymount
Shelby Cheslek, F/C, Gonzaga

Rankings
The AP Poll does not do a post-season rankings. As a result, their last rankings are Week 19. The Coaches Poll does a post-season poll and the end of the NCAA Tournament.

Non-Conference games
BYU defeated #12/11 Texas A&M 72–64 to win the Tom Weston Invitational.

Conference games

Composite Matrix
This table summarizes the head-to-head results between teams in conference play.

Conference tournament

  March 3–8, 2016– West Coast Conference Basketball Tournament, Orleans Arena, Paradise, Nevada.

Head coaches
The 2015-16 season sees one new face in the WCC. Lynne Roberts left Pacific to become the new head coach at Utah.

Jeff Judkins, BYU
Lisa Mispley Fortier, Gonzaga
Charity Elliott, Loyola Marymount
Bradley Davis, Pacific
Ryan Weisenberg, Pepperdine
Cheryl Sorensen, Portland
Paul Thomas, Saint Mary's
Cindy Fisher, San Diego
Jennifer Azzi, San Francisco
JR Payne, Santa Clara

Postseason

NCAA tournament

WNIT

WBI

Awards and honors

WCC Player-of-the-Week
The WCC player of the week awards are given each Monday.

 Nov. 16- Sydney Raggio, F, Saint Mary's 
 Nov. 30- GeAnna Luaulu-Summers, G, Pacific & Morgan McGwire, F, Santa Clara 
 Dec. 14- Lexi Rydalch, G, BYU
 Dec. 28- Maya Hood, F, San Diego
 Jan. 11- Kalani Purcell, F, BYU
 Jan. 25- Kalani Purcell, F, BYU
 Feb. 8- Lexi Rydalch, G, BYU
 Feb. 22- Marie Bertholdt, F, Santa Clara
 Nov. 23- Malina Hood, G, San Diego
 Dec. 7- Lauren Nicholson, G, Saint Mary's
 Dec. 21- Ameela Li, G, Pacific
 Jan. 4- Georgia Stirton, Gonzaga
 Jan. 18- Kalani Purcell, F, BYU
 Feb. 1- Lexi Rydalch, G, BYU
 Feb. 15- Taylor Proctor, F, San Francisco
 Feb. 29- Lauren Nicholson, G, Saint Mary's

College Madnesss West Coast Player of the Week

College Madness WCC player of the Week Awards are given every Sunday.

 Nov. 15- Maya Hood, F, San Diego
 Nov. 29- Morgan McGwire, F, Santa Clara (also High Major Player of the Week) 
 Dec. 13- Malina Hood, F, San Diego (also High Major Player of the Week) 
 Dec. 27- Lori Parkinson, F, Santa Clara
 Jan. 10- Lexi Rydalch, G, BYU
 Jan. 24- Malina Hood, G, San Diego
 Feb. 7- Lexi Rydalch, G, BYU
 Feb. 21- Marie Bertholdt, F, Santa Clara
 Nov. 22- Malina Hood, F, San Diego
 Dec. 6- Taylor Proctor, F, San Francisco
 Dec. 20- Lauren Nicholson, G, Saint Mary's
 Jan. 3- Lexi Rydalch, G, BYU
 Jan. 17- Lexi Rydalch, G, BYU
 Jan. 31- Lexi Rydalch, G, BYU (also High Major Player of the Week)
 Feb. 14- Erica Ogwumike, G, Pepperdine
 Feb. 28- Maya Hood, F, San Diego

All West Coast Conference teams
Voting was by conference coaches:
Player of The Year: Lexi Rydalch, BYU
Newcomer of The Year: Kalani Purcell, BYU
Defensive Player of The Year: Maya Hood, San Diego
Coach of The Year: Jeff Judkins, BYU

College Sports Madness Selections
To be posted after the WCC Tournament.

All-Conference First team 

College Sports Madness Selections
To be posted after the WCC Tournament.

All-Conference Second team 

College Sports Madness Selections
To be posted after the WCC Tournament.

Honorable mention

All-Freshman team

All-Academic team

All-Academic Honorable Mention

See also
2015-16 NCAA Division I women's basketball season
West Coast Conference women's basketball tournament
2015–16 West Coast Conference men's basketball season
West Coast Conference men's basketball tournament
2016 West Coast Conference men's basketball tournament

References